The following is a list of the largest European companies 2012, ordered by revenue in millions of US Dollars.

Largest European companies by revenue

See also 
List of companies by revenue
List of largest companies in the United States by revenue
List of companies of the European Union
List of largest European manufacturing companies by revenue
List of European financial services companies by revenue
List of largest manufacturing companies by revenue
List of largest employers
List of companies by profit and loss
List of public corporations by market capitalization
EURO STOXX 50
STOXX Europe 50
Fortune Global 500
 List of wealthiest organizations

References

 CNN Money - Fortune Global 500
 

Europe
Lists of companies of Europe
Economy-related lists of superlatives